James Murray (4 February 1933 – 10 July 2015) was a Scottish footballer. He played as an inside right for Heart of Midlothian and Scotland in the 1950s and early 1960s.

Murray made his first Scotland appearance in a 4–0 defeat to England at Hampden on 19 April 1958. He scored Scotland's first-ever goal in a World Cup finals match, in a 1–1 draw against Yugoslavia in 1958. He is also to this day the only Heart of Midlothian player to score a goal in the World Cup finals.

He won a total of five caps for Scotland. He also played for Reading, Falkirk, Clyde and Raith Rovers.

References

External links

London Hearts profile

1933 births
1958 FIFA World Cup players
2015 deaths
Association football inside forwards
Clyde F.C. players
Falkirk F.C. players
Heart of Midlothian F.C. players
Newtongrange Star F.C. players
Raith Rovers F.C. players
Reading F.C. players
Scotland international footballers
Scottish Football League players
Scottish footballers
Scottish Junior Football Association players
Footballers from Edinburgh
English Football League players
Falkirk F.C. non-playing staff
Scottish league football top scorers
Scottish Football League representative players